Ouachita River School District (ORSD) is a public school district located along the Ouachita River and is headquartered in Acorn, an unincorporated area in Polk County, Arkansas, United States, near Mena.

The Oauchita River School District provides early childhood, elementary, and secondary education to students in pre-kindergarten to twelfth grade at its four facilities and serving  of land in Polk County, Scott County and Montgomery County.

The service area includes Acorn, Oden, a small portion of Mena, Sims, and Pencil Bluff.

Ouachita River School District is accredited by the Arkansas Department of Education (ADE) and AdvancED.
 
Acorn Schools are located on U.S. Highway 71 north of Mena in Polk County.
 
Oden Schools are located on Arkansas Highway 88 between Pencil Bluff and Pine Ridge in Montgomery County.

History 
The district was established by the merger of the Acorn School District and the Oden School District on July 1, 2004.

Schools 
Secondary schools:
 Acorn High School— serving more than 300 students in grades 7 to 12.
 Oden High School— serving more than 100 students in grades 7 to 12.

Elementary schools:
 Acorn Elementary School— serving more than 275 students in pre-kindergarten to grade 6.
 Ode Maddox Elementary School— serving more than 125 students in pre-kindergarten to grade 6.

References

Further reading
These include maps of predecessor districts:
 2004-2005 School District Map
 Map of Arkansas School Districts pre-July 1, 2004
 (Download)

External links 
 
 

School districts in Arkansas
Education in Polk County, Arkansas
Education in Scott County, Arkansas
Education in Montgomery County, Arkansas
2004 establishments in Arkansas
School districts established in 2004